Dakinir Char (Island of Witch) is a Bengali crime thriller film directed and produced by Premendra Mitra based on the story of Mitra in the same name. This film was released on 28 January 1955 under the banner of Chitrani Films.

Cast
 Dhiraj Bhattacharya
 Jahor Roy
 Namita Singha
 Moni Shrimani
 Sabita Chatterjee
 Ajit Chattopadhyay
 Bipin Mukhopadhyay
 Dhiraj Das
 Bijoy Bose

References

External links
 

Bengali-language Indian films
Indian detective films
1955 crime drama films
1955 films
Films directed by Premendra Mitra
1950s Bengali-language films
Indian crime drama films